Gambaga College of Education is a teacher education college in Gambaga (East Mamprusi District, North East Region, Ghana) established in 2013. The college is located in Northern Zone. It is one of the about 40 public colleges of education in Ghana. The college participated in the DFID-funded T-TEL programme. It is affiliated with the University of Development Studies.

References 

Colleges of Education in Ghana
North East Region, Ghana
Educational institutions established in 2013
2013 establishments in Ghana